Sonia García Majarín (born 6 December 2002) is a Spanish professional footballer who plays as a defender for Atlético Madrid.

Club career
García Majarín started her career at Atlético Madrid's youth academy. She is often known simply by her maternal surname, Majarín. On 10 March 2021, she made her first team debut in a Champions League game against Chelsea, coming on as a substitute for Kylie Strom. On 17 July, she renewed her contract with Atlético Madrid until 2024 before the club announced that she was going on loan to Alavés, who themselves were recently promoted to the Primera División.

References

External links
Profile at La Liga

2002 births
Living people
People from Leganés
Footballers from the Community of Madrid
Spanish women's footballers
Women's association football defenders
Atlético Madrid Femenino players
Deportivo Alavés Gloriosas players
Segunda Federación (women) players
Primera División (women) players